Sinforosa Alcordo was a Cebuano fiction writer during the pre-War era.

References
 www.bisaya.com Visayan Literature page—defunct

Visayan writers
Cebuano writers
Filipino writers
Filipino women writers
Year of birth missing
Year of death missing
Cebuano people